is a national highway connecting Sapporo and Muroran in Hokkaidō, Japan.

Route data
Length: 133.0 km (82.7 mi)
Origin: Chuo-ku, Sapporo, Sapporo (originates at the origins of Routes 12 and 230)
Terminus: Muroran, Hokkaido
Major cities: Chitose, Tomakomai, Noboribetsu

History
1952-12-04 - First Class National Highway 36 (from Sapporo to Muroran)
1965-04-01 - General National Highway 36 (from Sapporo to Muroran)

Municipalities passed through
Ishikari Subprefecture
Sapporo - Kitahiroshima - Eniwa - Chitose
Iburi Subprefecture
Tomakomai - Shiraoi - Noboribetsu - Muroran

Intersects with

Ishikari Subprefecture
Routes 12 and 230; at the origin, in Chuo-ku, Sapporo
Route 453; at Toyohira-ku, Sapporo
Route 337; at Chitose City
Iburi subprefecture
Route 234; at Numanohata, Tomakomai City
Route 276; at Motonakano-cho, Tomakomai City
Route 37; at Muroran City

References

036
Roads in Hokkaido